Taylor McNamara (born August 12, 1994) is an American football tight end who is currently a free agent. He played college football at Oklahoma and USC.

Professional career

Cleveland Browns
McNamara signed with the Cleveland Browns as an undrafted free agent on May 4, 2017. He was waived on September 1, 2017 during roster cutdowns.

References

External links
Oklahoma Sooners bio
USC Trojans bio

Living people
1994 births
Oklahoma Sooners football players
USC Trojans football players
Cleveland Browns players
American football tight ends
Players of American football from San Diego